The Center for Digital Arts and Experimental Media, or DXARTS, is a program offering PhD studies in new media art at the University of Washington.

The goal of doctoral education in Digital Arts and Experimental Media is to create opportunities for artists to discover and document new knowledge and expertise at the most advanced levels higher education can offer. While creating new art is at the center of all activities in the program, the DXARTS PhD is a research-oriented degree requiring a substantial commitment to graduate-level study and reflection. The Ph.D. degree prepares artists to pursue original creative and technical research in Digital Arts and Experimental Media and pioneer lasting innovations on which future artists and scholars can build.

History

The Center for Digital Arts and Experimental Media (DXARTS) began as a new program at the University of Washington within the College of Arts & Sciences in 2001. It began offering BFA and PhD degrees in Fall 2004. Prior to that, the program offered courses and supported independent research projects for students from diverse departments within the University of Washington. The program builds on the work done at both the Center for Advanced Research Technology in the Arts and Humanities (CARTAH) and the School of Music Computer Center (SMCC). Over the past several years, DXARTS/CARTAH and SMCC have assembled an increasing range of audio tools for high-end research, production, post-production, and presentation. This has enabled students to pioneer new sonic art forms and create award-winning audio works. Recently it has broadened its approaches to new media and digital arts, creating a full BFA and PhD major around the curriculum. These genres and mediums include: 
 BioArt
 Computer art
 Digital art
 Electronic art
 Generative art
 Interactive art
 Net art
 Performance art
 Robotic art
 Software art
 Sound art
 Systems art
 Telematic art
 Video art
 Virtual art

Current Faculty
 James Coupe
 Richard Karpen
 Juan Pampin
 Edward A. Shanken (visiting 2013-15)

Notable Resident Artists

External links

 

Art schools in Washington (state)
University of Washington